Gunabati College  is located in the heart of Gunabati Bazar. It offers higher-secondary education (HSC). It has degree pass course program which is affiliated to the National University of Bangladesh. It's EIIN code is 105509.

History 
It was established on 1 July 1968. It was founded by principal Sayed Lutfor Rahman.

Education program 
In Gunabati College, the educational activities of the intermediate section is affiliated to Comilla Education Board and degree pass course is affiliated to National University of Bangladesh.

Higher secondary education 
In Gunabati College, science, humanities and commerce of HSC or Higher Secondary Education section is taught.

Co-education programs 
 Scouting 
 Sports (athletics, cricket and football)
 Debating 
 Cultural events
 Learning tour etc.

Uniform 
The uniform of Gunabati College is azure-colored shirt and black pant. Both long sleeve or short sleeve shirts are acceptable. Shirts must have the right-sleeve College monogram badge.

Infrastructure 
Though Gunabati College is established in 1968, Its infrastructure is undeveloped. It does not have the necessary infrastructure. The most notable of which is the shortage of classrooms.

See also
List of Educational Institutions in Comilla

References 

Universities and colleges in Cumilla District
Colleges in Comilla District